Ariel Suárez (born 24 February 1980, in San Fernando) is an Argentine rower. He competed in the double sculls at the 2012 Summer Olympics where he finished 4th together with Cristian Rosso. Ariel has won two gold medals and a bronze medal at the 2011 Pan American Games and two silver medals at the 2007 Pan American Games. In 2010 he was granted the Konex Award Merit Diploma as one of the five best rowers of the last decade in Argentina.

References 
 

1980 births
Living people
Argentine male rowers
Pan American Games gold medalists for Argentina
Pan American Games bronze medalists for Argentina
Rowers at the 2012 Summer Olympics
Olympic rowers of Argentina
Rowers at the 2011 Pan American Games
Pan American Games silver medalists for Argentina
Pan American Games medalists in rowing
South American Games gold medalists for Argentina
South American Games medalists in rowing
Competitors at the 2014 South American Games
Rowers at the 2007 Pan American Games
Rowers at the 2019 Pan American Games
Medalists at the 2007 Pan American Games
Medalists at the 2019 Pan American Games
Medalists at the 2011 Pan American Games
People from San Fernando Partido
Sportspeople from Buenos Aires Province